Diable Tonnere is a loa (deity) who presides over thunder in Haitian Vodou.

References 

Haitian Vodou gods
Thunder gods